The Supercoppa Italiana is an annual football match contested by the winners of the Serie A and the Coppa Italia in the previous season. If the same team wins both the Serie A and Coppa Italia titles in the previous season, the Supercoppa is contested by the Serie A winner and the Coppa Italia runner-up, in essence becoming a rematch of the previous year's Coppa Italia final.

Originally, it was scheduled in the summer as a super cup curtain-raiser to the new season, played in the home stadium of the Serie A champion. In recent years, the match has been scheduled during the winter and is contested mainly outside of Italy. Juventus holds the record for winning the cup a record nine times. The most frequent Supercoppa match-up has been Juventus against Lazio, occurring on five occasions.

History

Inaugurated in 1988, 18 of the first 21 Supercoppa Italiana contested were played at the home of the Serie A winners, the exceptions being in 1993 and 2003, when it was held in the United States cities of Washington, D.C., and East Rutherford, New Jersey, and in 2002 when the game was played in the Libyan capital Tripoli. Since 2009, nine of the fourteen venues chosen have been outside of Italy.

Of the 35 finals played to date, the venues have been as follows:
 Twenty times at the home of the Serie A winners;
 Four times in China;
 Three times in Saudi Arabia;
 Twice in the United States;
 Twice in Doha, Qatar;
 Twice at the Stadio Olimpico in Rome acting as a "neutral venue" (where it was not the home ground of the Serie A winners);
 Once in Tripoli, Libya;
 Once at the Mapei Stadium – Città del Tricolore in Reggio Emilia acting as a "neutral venue" (where it was not the home ground of the Serie A winners).

Since the game was first established, the Serie A scudetto and Coppa Italia have been won by the same team eight times, thus making the Coppa Italia runners-up the second participant in the subsequent Supercoppa. This occurred in the following years: 1995, 2015, 2016, 2017 and 2018 (Juventus), 2000 (Lazio), 2006 and 2010 (Internazionale).

On 23 December 2016, Milan became the first Coppa Italia runners-up to win the Supercoppa Italiana, after defeating Juventus on penalties.

In 2018, Serie A signed a deal with the General Sports Authority that would see Saudi Arabia host three of the next five Supercoppa Italiana.

Editions

Performance by club

Performance by representative

All-time top goalscorers

Notes

References

External links

 Supercoppa Italiana on RSSSF

 
Italy
2
Recurring sporting events established in 1988
1988 establishments in Italy